Kenwick Pioneer Cemetery is located in Kenwick, Western Australia adjacent to Albany Highway.

In 1865 a rammed earth building with shingle roof was constructed by convicts. Kenwick School, sometimes referred to as Canning School, opened with six pupils and was the district's only school for 20 years. The school, with accommodation for a school teacher and police constable, served as school, courthouse, church, post office and social centre for many years.

The first meeting of the Canning Roads Board met in the school room in 1870. Members were 
 W.L. Gibbs, 
 E. Powell, 
 T. Buckingham Jnr, 
 J. White, 
 E.M. Marsh, 
 F. Watts, and 
 F. Bird.

A church, St Michael and All Angels, was built on a site next to the school and served the district until the end of the century.

The school closed in 1896 and in 1900 the school and church were demolished. Only the cemetery remains. Over 200 people were buried at the cemetery during its use, however few grave stones remain.

References 

1866 establishments in Australia
Cemeteries in Western Australia
Kenwick, Western Australia
Western Australian places listed on the defunct Register of the National Estate
Heritage places of Western Australia